The 1994 DFS Classic was a women's tennis tournament played on outdoor grass courts. It was the 13th edition of the event. It took place at the Edgbaston Priory Club in Birmingham, United Kingdom, from 6 June until 12 June 1994.

Entrants

Seeds

Other entrants
The following players received wildcards into the main draw:
  Jo Durie
  Monique Javer
  Claire Taylor

The following players received entry from the qualifying draw:
  Isabelle Demongeot
  Kerry-Anne Guse
  Mareze Joubert
  Shannan McCarthy
  Nicole Pratt
  Julie Pullin
  Shirli-Ann Siddall
  Elena Tatarkova

The following player received a lucky loser spot:
  Julie Steven

Headers

Singles

 Lori McNeil defeated  Zina Garrison-Jackson 6–2, 6–2
 It was McNeil's first title of the year and the 10th of her career.

Doubles

 Zina Garrison-Jackson /  Larisa Savchenko defeated  Catherine Barclay /  Kerry-Anne Guse 6–4, 6–4
 It was Garrison-Jackson's first doubles title of the year and the 20th of her career. It was Savchenko's fourth doubles title of the year and the 45th of her career.

External links
 1994 DFS Classic draws
 ITF tournament edition details

DFS Classic
Birmingham Classic (tennis)
DFS Classic
DFS Classic